John Bilezikjian (February 1, 1948 – January 19, 2015) was an Armenian-American musician and composer born in Los Angeles. Most renowned as an oud master, he also played the violin, mandolin and dumbek. He was also a traditional and contemporary singer singing in Armenian, but also in Turkish, Assyrian/Syriac, English and known for his contributions to world music as a solo act and in collaborations with renowned artists. He established his own record company, Dantz Records in Laguna Hills, California making many recordings, and appearing in tens of film soundtracks.

Collaborations included Leonard Cohen in Recent Songs (1979) after touring with him on his live concerts, resulting in Cohen Live album in 1994 and The Smokey Life Tour recorded in 1979. He played oud in Cohen's 1988 album I'm Your Man. In 1992, he collaborated with British singer Robert Palmer in the latter's album  Ridin' High, where he played oud and dumbek in "Want You More". In 1997, he recorded with Mexican singer Luis Miguel in the latter's album playing mandolin in Romances and in 1994 with Plácido Domingo in De Mi Alma Latina and in 1999 in Por Amor.

In 2002, he joined the world music band Brothers of the Baladi recording in their album Hope. He also played with the Armenian-American musician Armen Chakmakian and singers Roupen Altiparmakian and Andy Madadian

He played with many orchestras including The Los Angeles Philharmonic Orchestra, The Los Angeles Mandolin Orchestra, The Pacific Palisades Symphony. In 2005 he played with the Boston Pops Orchestra as featured soloist, marking the first time the oud was heard in a solo capacity with that orchestra on its stage. He later appeared as a bouzouki soloist with The Pasadena Pops Orchestra. He has played in recordings by Alberto Mizrahi, Brothers of the Baladi, Steve Young, David Such, Radim Zenkl.

He died on January 19, 2015, from kidney disease aged 66.

Discography
(Selective)
1995: Music from the Armenian Diaspora
1999: Tapestry of the Dance
2007: Atlantis
2008: All-Time Armenian Favorites
2009: Sounds of the Middle East
2012: Pomegranate

Live
America's Oud Virtuoso Recorded in Concert Live at the Wilshire Ebell Theatre in Los Angeles

Collaborations
1992: Sephardic Songs of Love and Hope Canticas Sephardis de Amor y Esperansa (Gordon Lustig, John Bilezikjian & Judy Frankel)
2002: The Music of "La Danse Orientale" – John Bilezikjian and Aziz Khadra

Books
2006: John Bilezikjian, Hal Leonard Oud Method (plus accompanying CD) (by Hal Leonard Corporation)

References

External links
 Dantz Records
 john Bilezikjian Foundation 
 
 Don Heckman: ″Musician John Bilezikjian dies at 66; master of the Middle Eastern oud.″ Obituary in the Los Angeles Times, January 27, 2015

Armenian musicians
American people of Armenian descent
1948 births
2015 deaths
Musicians from Los Angeles
Oud players
American world music musicians
American male violinists
American mandolinists
Deaths from kidney disease
20th-century American violinists
20th-century American male musicians